The Northwest Sinfonia is a session symphonic orchestra based in Seattle, mostly renowned for recording soundtracks to motion pictures and computer games. It was founded in 1995 and is credited with over 100 recordings.

It draws its members mostly from the Seattle Symphony, Seattle Opera, and Pacific Northwest Ballet orchestras. An additional chorus is added if required. (as the Northwest Sinfonia and Chorale). David Sabee is the organization's music director and executive director.

Recordings (selections)

Film Scores
The Revenant (2015)
Underworld: Awakening (2012)
Mirror Mirror (2012)
There Be Dragons (2011, international cut only) 
Beastly (2011)
Red (2010)
The Blind Side (2009)
The Men Who Stare at Goats (2009)
The Last House on the Left (2009)
I Love You Beth Cooper (2009)
Drag Me to Hell (2009)
The Incredible Hulk (2008)
The Great Buck Howard (2008)
Rambo (2008)
Valkyrie (2008)
The Forbidden Kingdom (2008)
Ghost Rider (2007)
The Grudge 2 (2006)
Lord of War (2005)
Brokeback Mountain (2005)
Wedding Crashers (2005)
Blade: Trinity (2004)
The Grudge (2004)
Thirteen Ghosts (2001)
Smoke Signals (1998)
Barney's Great Adventure (1998)
Everest (1998)
Hellraiser: Bloodline (1996)
The Arrival (1996)

Television
Stargate The Ark Of Truth (2008)
Stargate Continuum (2008)
Stargate Atlantis (2006)
Frontier House (2002)

Video games
Golem (2019)
Destiny 2: Shadowkeep (2019)
Destiny 2: Forsaken (2018)
Destiny 2 (2017)
Destiny: The Taken King (2015)
Destiny (2014)
Middle-earth: Shadow of Mordor (2014)
Planetary Annihilation (2014)
Diablo III: Reaper of Souls (2014)
Dota 2 (2013)
PlanetSide 2 (2012)World of Warcraft: Cataclysm (2010)Dragon Age: Origins (2009)Halo 3:ODST (2009)World of Warcraft: Wrath of the Lich King (2008)Crysis (2007)Halo 1-3 (2001–2007)Gears of War (2006)Rise of Nations: Rise of Legends (2006)Age of Empires III (2005)Gauntlet: Seven Sorrows (2005)Star Wars: Knights of the Old Republic II: The Sith Lords (2005)Mercenaries: Playground of Destruction (2004)The Hobbit (2003)Secret Weapons Over Normandy (2003)Medal of Honor: Frontline (2002)Age of Mythology (2002)Myst III: Exile (2001)Medal of Honor: Underground (2000)Medal of Honor (1999)Total Annihilation (1997)

Collaborations
Terence Blanchard Quintet
E.S. Posthumus
Alejandro Sanz
Immediate Music / Globus
Chris Field Sub-Conscious

References
Internet Movie Database
Official homepage

American orchestras
Musical groups established in 1995
Musical groups from Seattle
Globus (music)
Performing arts in Washington (state)
American session musicians
American instrumental musical groups
Symphony orchestras
Video game musicians